Joseph Calleia (born Joseph Alexander Caesar Herstall Vincent Calleja, August 4, 1897 – October 31, 1975) was a Maltese-born American actor and singer on the stage and in films, radio and television.

After serving in the British Transport Service during World War I, he travelled to the United States and began his career on the stage, initially in musical comedy, but later in original Broadway productions such as Broadway (1926), The Front Page (1928), The Last Mile (1930), and Grand Hotel (1930). Calleia became a star with the play Small Miracle (1934), his first real role as a villain, and he was put under contract by Metro-Goldwyn-Mayer.

Calleia excelled as the villain in Hollywood films, but he fought against typecasting and created a succession of darkly mysterious characters edged with humor in films such as Algiers (1938), Five Came Back (1939), Golden Boy (1939), The Glass Key (1942) and Gilda (1946). During World War II, Calleia led the Malta War Relief organization in the United States, and toured for the USO and the Hollywood Victory Committee. After the war, he continued to work steadily in motion pictures and television, and he starred in the 1948 London stage premiere of Arthur Miller's Tony Award-winning play All My Sons. Calleia's performance in Orson Welles's 1958 film Touch of Evil is regarded as one of the best in his career.

Biography

Joseph Alexander Caesar Herstall Vincent Calleja was born on August 4, 1897, in Notabile (now called Mdina), in the administrative area of Saqqajja, in the Crown Colony of Malta. His parents were Pasquale and Eleonore Calleja; his father was an architect. Calleia studied at St. Julian's and St. Aloysius Colleges. At age 12 he used the English pound given to him for Christmas to buy two dozen harmonicas, and organized a local band whose performances were soon netting £100 a week. Sent by his father to London to study engineering, Calleia employed his good tenor voice in music halls, performing ballads of the Scottish Highlands in traditional dress. He worked as Joseph Spurin, using his mother's maiden name due to his father's disapproval.

In 1914 Calleia joined the British Transport Service. After cruising the world for two-and-a-half years, his ship was torpedoed in the English Channel. Hospitalized for three months, Calleia was awarded a campaign medal and honorably discharged. He traveled to the United States in 1917. Unemployed, he sang for the Red Cross and armed services, and volunteered for the American Tank Corps.

Calleia began his stage career on Armistice Day. After World War I, he had only limited success in vaudeville. He earned his living stoking the furnace at a department store, and got a night job washing and repairing New York City streetcars. By day, he haunted theatrical booking offices. The Henry W. Savage agency sent Calleia to Denver, where he made his stage debut singing in the chorus of Jerome Kern's musical comedy Have a Heart. The following season, he had a bit part in Pietro (1920), an Otis Skinner vehicle that played six weeks on Broadway and 40 weeks on tour. Calleia supplemented his salary by working as assistant stage manager and repairing trunks at $3 each.

Calleia's first speaking role on the stage was in The Broken Wing (1920), a Broadway comedy starring George Abbott and Louis Wolheim. He understudied all of the parts and appeared as a Mexican peon who played the guitar and sang a song called "Adelai". Calleia composed the tune, and asked Abbott to write the lyrics; the song was published and eventually brought each of them royalties of as much as $2,000 a year. The Broken Wing was a hit, and after the play's New York run, Calleia and Thurston Hall were carried over in a London production. 

After four months, the show closed, and Calleia visited Malta, where he and his father reconciled. At his father's request he began using his real surname, and was billed as Joseph Spurin-Calleia.

On February 14, 1925, Calleia made his concert debut at Town Hall in New York City, accompanied by pianist Ferdinand Greenwald. "He proved to be the possessor of an agreeable high voice, which he used with much skill in Italian airs," wrote New York Times music critic Olin Downes, "including that of Rodolfo from Puccini's La Boheme and others from Verdi's Trovatore and Rigoletto." In recital at New York's Steinway Hall on February 21, 1926, Calleia "displayed a voice of pleasant and attractive timbre" in a program that included works by Scarlatti, Paisiello, Schumann, Gounod and Leoncavallo, as well as two of his own compositions.

Calleia was cast as the Spanish ambassador in the Broadway production of Princess Flavia (1925), Sigmund Romberg's musical adaptation of The Prisoner of Zenda. While he was waiting for the elaborate production to be mounted, he sold pianos with such success that the store owner offered him a store of his own if he would stay.

In 1926, Calleia landed his first prominent stage role, in George Abbott and Philip Dunning's smash hit, Broadway. He played a shuffling, coin-jingling waiter in the melodrama that New York Times critic Brooks Atkinson later called a "noisy, bustling cyclorama of backstage life [that] remains a landmark in the American theater." Calleia also acted as the company's stage manager and, working for producer Jed Harris, he supervised some ten duplicate productions of Broadway in the US and abroad.

A succession of acclaimed performances in successful Broadway plays followed, including as a shiftless newspaper reporter in The Front Page (1928), a convicted murderer in The Last Mile (1930), and the sinister chauffeur in Grand Hotel (1930). Calleia became a star with Small Miracle (1934), a Broadway production described by The New Yorker as "a very satisfactory melodrama with Joseph Spurin-Calleia as the pleasantest murderer you ever saw."

"What an actor—Joseph Calleia", said Orson Welles, who directed and performed with Calleia in Touch of Evil (1958):

I fell in love with him as a ten-year-old boy. I saw him in a play in New York ... a very well-staged melodrama which was an enormous hit for about a year—it was made as a movie later with somebody else. He had the leading role, and I never forgot him. And through the years I'd seen him in movies—little things. And I could never forget that performance of his. He's always played very stereotyped parts in pictures but is one of the best actors I've ever known. I have such respect for him. You play next to him and you just feel the thing that you do with a big actor—this dynamo going on.

Naming the theatre's villain of the year for 1934, nationally syndicated columnist Paul Harrison of the Newspaper Enterprise Association selected "Joseph Spurin-Calleia, whose gangster role in Small Miracle provided one of the finest of all performances on Broadway."

Calleia had his first real role as a villain in Small Miracle, and his success in the play was responsible for his move to Hollywood. Calleia's contract with Metro-Goldwyn-Mayer permitted him a hiatus of six months a year, to continue his stage work. He was not new to motion pictures—he had made three feature films on the East Coast—but when MGM put Calleia under contract, they promoted his first film, Public Hero No. 1 (1935), as his screen debut. Calleia's portrayal of the gunman was listed by film critic Andre Sennwald of The New York Times as one of the year's ten best male performances.

Calleia excelled as the bad guy in films, but he wanted to create characters with some sympathy. "I'd like to get away from straight villain roles," he said in a 1936 interview. "But I have no wish to be a hero. I enjoy roles where I get slapped around a bit. It's far more stimulating to play a character that isn't all one thing—not all bad and not all good." He created a series of darkly mysterious characters edged with humor in films including Algiers (1938), Five Came Back (1939), Golden Boy (1939), The Glass Key (1942) and Gilda (1946).

In June 1935, Calleia was announced to star as Joaquin Murrieta in I Am Joaquin (later titled Robin Hood of El Dorado), a film for which he had written the screenplay. MGM replaced him with Warner Baxter, ostensibly because Calleia was too old, although Baxter was six years older. Calleia did star in Man of the People (1937), a political drama about a young lawyer fighting corporate racketeers.

Calleia continued to battle typecasting, turning down well-paying villainous roles to develop more complex characters. His performance as Police Inspector Slimane in Walter Wanger's Algiers (1938) was recognized by the National Board of Review. Working with director John Farrow at RKO Pictures in 1939, he created a fine character study as the condemned anarchist in Five Came Back, and portrayed a heroic priest in Full Confession. Calleia was announced to star as Father Damien in an RKO picture to be written and directed by Farrow, but the project was not realized.

Calleia became a naturalized American citizen in November 1941. During World War II, Calleia led the Malta War Relief organization in the United States. The house where he was born was destroyed in 1942; his family took refuge underground in ancient catacombs during the near-constant aerial bombing of Malta by the Axis powers that lasted for more than two years. Under the auspices of the Motion Picture Division of USO Camp Shows, he made personal appearances at American military facilities in 1943. He also accepted an invitation from the Hollywood Victory Committee to make a tour of military camps in North Africa, particularly because the tentative itinerary included Malta. On the  trip, Calleia and his small troupe entertained service personnel in Natal, Dakar, along the coast to Casablanca and across to Tunis, before going to Malta, which Calleia had not visited since 1922. They gave two shows a day and visited all of the hospitals at each stop; and they presented six shows in Malta as part of the exchange program between American and British entertainment units.

In addition to working steadily in motion pictures for another 20 years, Calleia also starred in the 1948 London stage premiere of Arthur Miller's Tony Award-winning play All My Sons, receiving unanimous critical acclaim. His performance in Touch of Evil (1958)—as Pete Menzies, longtime partner of corrupt Police Captain Hank Quinlan (Orson Welles)—is regarded as one of the best of his career.

"It is not rare in Welles's films for one actor to break away from the overall gesture of the film to embody a distilled human truth," wrote Welles biographer Simon Callow. "In Touch of Evil there are two actors who do this—Dietrich and Joseph Calleia, playing Quinlan's deceived colleague, Menzies. Calleia's haunted features figure more and more prominently on screen as the truth about Quinlan increasingly dawns on him, along with the knowledge that he must betray him. ... Calleia's abundant inner life casts a growing spell over the film as it comes to its climax, bringing to vividly personal life Welles's sempiternal subject: betrayal."

Calleia retired in 1963 to Sliema, Malta. His wife, Eleanor Vassallo Calleia, whom he had married in 1929, died there in 1967. Calleia died on October 31, 1975, aged 78, in St. Julian's. He was interred in the family vault at Santa Maria Addolorata Cemetery in Paola.

Theatre credits

Filmography

Select radio credits

Legacy

Calleia was posthumously honored by the Malta postal authority with a set of two commemorative stamps issued in 1997. In 2005, a bust of Calleia by sculptor Anton Agius was installed at his birthplace in Malta on the initiative of then 15-year-old Eman Bonnici.

Notes

References

External links

 
 
 
 
 

1897 births
1975 deaths
Maltese male film actors
20th-century Maltese male singers
20th-century Maltese singers
Maltese male stage actors
Metro-Goldwyn-Mayer contract players
Maltese male television actors
Maltese emigrants to the United States
People from Mdina
Burials at Addolorata Cemetery, Paola